Hemiphractus proboscideus, or the Sumaco horned treefrog, is a species of frog in the family Hemiphractidae. It is found in the upper Amazon basin in extreme southwestern Colombia (Amazonas and Caquetá Departments), Ecuador, and northern Peru.

Description
Males measure  and females  in snout–vent length. The head is triangular in dorsal view. Snout is elongated to a proboscis, and there is a large conical and several small tubercles on the eyes. At night, the body is yellowish with brown diagonal or transverse bars and with crossbars in the extremities; the belly is grayish-cream to white. By day, the back is brown with darker brown markings; the ventral surface is brown to reddish brown with orange or yellow spots on the belly, and yellow or white spots on the gular region. Tongue is orange.

Reproduction and behaviour
Reproduction seems to occur throughout year as juveniles have been encountered during all months. Development is direct, and the female carries her eggs on her back.

Hemiphractus proboscideus is a predatory species that eats other frogs. At night, they are typically found sitting on low vegetation. When disturbed, the frog will open its mouth to show its bright-coloured tongue. They can deliver a strong bite.

Habitat and conservation
Its natural habitats are moist tropical forest at elevations of  asl. It is a rare species. No major threats have been identified, but it has declined in Ecuador for unknown reasons. Its range includes several protected areas.

References

proboscideus
Amphibians of Colombia
Amphibians of Ecuador
Amphibians of Peru
Taxa named by Marcos Jiménez de la Espada
Amphibians described in 1870
Taxonomy articles created by Polbot